Abdulrahman Anwar al-Awlaki (also spelled al-Aulaqi, ; August 26, 1995 – October 14, 2011) was a 16-year-old United States citizen who was killed while eating dinner at an outdoor restaurant in Yemen by a drone airstrike ordered by U.S. President Barack Obama on October 14, 2011. Abdulrahman al-Awlaki's father, Anwar al-Awlaki, was alleged to be an operational leader of al-Qaeda in the Arabian Peninsula. Anwar was killed by a CIA drone strike also ordered by Obama two weeks prior to the killing of his son.

Killing
Human rights groups questioned why al-Awlaki was killed by the U.S. in a country with which the United States was not at war. Jameel Jaffer, deputy legal director of the American Civil Liberties Union, stated "If the government is going to be firing Predator missiles at American citizens, surely the American public has a right to know who's being targeted, and why."

Two U.S. officials speaking on condition of anonymity stated that the target of the October 14, 2011, airstrike was Ibrahim al-Banna, an Egyptian believed to be a senior operative in Al-Qaeda in the Arabian Peninsula. Another U.S. administration official speaking on condition of anonymity described Abdulrahman al-Awlaki as a bystander who was "in the wrong place at the wrong time," stating that "the U.S. government did not know that Mr. Awlaki's son was there" before the airstrike was ordered. When pressed by a reporter to defend the targeted killing policy that resulted in Abdulrahman al-Awlaki's death, former White House press secretary Robert Gibbs deflected blame to the victim's father: "I would suggest that you should have a far more responsible father if they are truly concerned about the well-being of their children. I don't think becoming an al-Qaeda jihadist terrorist is the best way to go about doing your business."

Killing of half-sister

On January 29, 2017, Anwar al-Awlaki's 8-year-old daughter, Nawar al-Awlaki, the half-sister of Abdulrahman al-Awlaki, was killed in the Raid on Yakla, a commando attack ordered by President Donald Trump.

See also

 Nawar al-Awlaki
 Targeted killing
 Disposition Matrix
 Executive actions of the CIA
 CIA activities in Yemen
 Drone strikes in Yemen

References

External links
An American Teenager in Yemen: Paying for the Sins of His Father?, article about Yemeni reaction to American drone attacks
A Tale of Two Murders Antiwar.com, March 31, 2012

Deaths by drone strikes of the Central Intelligence Agency in Yemen
Anwar al-Awlaki
Obama administration controversies